Martin Gillingham (born 9 September 1963, in Leicester) is an English sports commentator and journalist. He commentates on rugby union for various broadcasters including Sky Sports, BT Sport, ITV, SuperSport, and Setanta Ireland, and on athletics for Eurosport.

He was educated at the Royal Grammar School, High Wycombe, where fellow student Barrie Marsden first showed him how to jump over a hurdle, later dropped out of Harvard University in the United States, before going to Carnegie College in Leeds.

In 1984, he won the AAA 400m hurdles title and was selected for the Olympic Games in Los Angeles. Three years later he competed in the same event at the IAAF World Championships in Rome. His best time was 49.82sec which he set in finishing third behind Edwin Moses and Kriss Akabusi in a Grand Prix meeting at Crystal Palace, London in July 1987.

In 1992, he moved to South Africa to be the athletics and Olympics correspondent for the Johannesburg Sunday Times. He later became a talkshow host on radio station Capetalk in Cape Town.

In 2003, he returned to England after which he worked for five years on BBC Radio Five Live presenting sports bulletins and reporting on rugby matches and had a brief stint as a presenter on Talksport. He is now heard as a rugby commentator on the Heineken Cup for Sky Sports and the Aviva Premiership on ITV. He was also a member of ITV's commentary team at the 2011 Rugby World Cup in New Zealand.

Martin is regarded as an expert on French rugby having worked for three seasons as lead commentator on ESPN's coverage of the Top 14 until they lost the rights at the end of the 2011/12 season. During the 2012/13 season his Top 14 commentary was heard on channels around the world including on Setanta Ireland, Premier Sports in the UK and SuperSport in Africa. The UK rights to French rugby moved to Sky Sports where Martin now commentates on the Top 14 matches.

References

1963 births
British sports broadcasters
Sportspeople from Leicester
British sports journalists
Harvard University people
Athletes (track and field) at the 1984 Summer Olympics
Olympic athletes of Great Britain
British male hurdlers
Living people
People educated at the Royal Grammar School, High Wycombe